Principles of Labor Legislation (1916) was a foundational US labor law text, written in the United States by John R. Commons and John Bertram Andrews.

Contents
Chapter I: THE BASIS OF LABOR LAW i 
1. The Labor Contract i 
2. Individual Rights 5 
3. Due Process of Law 9
Chapter II: INDIVIDUAL BARGAINING 35 
1. The Laborer as Debtor 35 
2. The Laborer as Creditor 50 
3. The Laborer as Tenant 61 
4. The Laborer as Competitor 68 
5. Legal Aid and Industrial Courts 80
Chapter III: COLLECTIVE BARGAINING 91 
1. The Law of Conspiracy 91 
2. Mediation by Government 124 
3. Coercion by Government 139 
4. Unions of Government Employees 160
Chapter IV: THE MINIMUM WAGE  167 
1. Economic Basis 168 
2. Historical Development 171 
3. Standards 179 
4. Methods of Operation 185 
5. Results 190 
6. Constitutionality 196
Chapter V: HOURS OF LABOR 200 
I. Maximum Daily Hours 204 
2. Rest Periods 246
Chapter VI: UNEMPLOYMENT 261 
1. Regulation of Private Employment Offices .... 264 
2. Public Employment Exchanges 270 
3. Systematic Distribution of Public Work 283 
4. Regularization of Industry 290
Chapter VII: SAFETY AND HEALTH 295 
1. Reporting 297 
2. Prohibition 304 
3. Regulation 327
Chapter VIII: SOCIAL INSURANCE 354 
1. Industrial Accident Insurance 356 
2. Health Insurance 385 
3. Old Age and Invalidity Insurance 397 
4. Widows' and Orphans' Insurance 406 
5. Unemployment Insurance 409
Chapter IX: ADMINISTRATION 415 
1. The Executive 416 
2. The Legislature 419 
3. The Judiciary 422 
4. The Industrial Commission 430 
5. Penalties and Prosecutions 454 
6. Cooperation by Pressure 462
Select Critical Bibliography 465 
Table of Cases Cited 489 
Index 497

See also
US labor law
UK labour law
Sidney Webb and Beatrice Webb, Industrial Democracy (1890)

Notes

External links
Full text on archive.org

Labour law